Jayakarta Station (JAY) is a railway station serving by KRL Commuterline system. It is located at Jl. Pangeran Jayakarta. It is the named after a Banten prince with the same name.

This station is one of the new stations on the Manggarai-Jakarta Kota railway when it was converted an elevated train line. When the Manggarai-Jakarta Kota cross line was still below (at-grade with ground level), this station did not yet exist.

History 
In February 1988, the Manggarai–Jakarta Kota elevated railway project was held which cost Rp. 432.5 billion, this project also included the construction of new train stations on this line including Jayakarta Station.

On June 5, 1992, President Soeharto along with Mrs. Tien Soeharto and other government officials inaugurated this elevated train line by taking the executive class Rheostatic electric multiple unit (KRL) from Gambir Station to Jakarta Kota Station. At the time it was inaugurated, the construction of the elevated railway line had not been fully completed, until it was finally fully operational a year later.

Building and layout 
The Jayakarta Station building is in a modern style, with a touch of fanta pink panels which are still maintained to this day and have never been painted, only the platform poles have been changed to crimson.

Unlike other stations on the Jakarta Kota–Manggarai elevated railway which has three floors, this station only has two floors. The reason is because this elevated train line will descend and tread to the ground and end at Jakarta Kota Station.

In this station area there is also one remnant of the old railroad bridge left over from the Manggarai-Jakarta Kota route when it was still on the ground, the remains of this railroad bridge has now changed its function to become a road for residents. Previously, there were 2 bridges here because the Manggarai-Jakarta Kota route was a double track. However, the other bridge has been dismantled because the land will be used for the construction of the station's elevated platform foundation and only one bridge remains.

Jayakarta Station has two lines. In 2019-2020, a new crossing point was installed which is located about 50-70 meters to the south from Jayakarta Station, as well as an overhead line modification for the line on the station's railroad switch.

Services 
The following is a list of train services at the Jayakarta Station.

Passenger services 
 KAI Commuter

Supporting transportation

References

central Jakarta
Railway stations in Jakarta